Zak Spears, (born January 15, 1965) is an American gay pornographic film actor. Spears appeared in the feature film The Doom Generation (1995) using his real name, Khristofor Rossianov.

Spears also appeared in the black comedy feature film Forgiving the Franklins (2006) under the name Khris Scaramanga. The film's director, Jay Floyd, said that having Spears in his film helped raise its profile. "I have one star in my movie," Floyd told The Los Angeles Times. "He just happens to be a porn star."

Initially retiring from the industry in 1996, he made a return in 2004 in the film Zak Attack, sporting a dramatic image change which included a shaved head and a much bulkier build.

Awards

Grabby Awards 
 1993 Best Newcomer
 1994 Best Actor, a tie with Ty Fox
 2000 Wall of Fame inductee
 2004 Best Duo Sex Scene,  with Johnny Hazzard in Bolt; tied with Tag Adams and Aiden Shaw in Perfect Fit
 2004 Best Non-Sex Performance, in Buckleroos Parts I and II

GayVN Awards 
 2001 Hall of Fame
 2002 Best Actor, The Joint; tied with Tony Donovan, Carnal Intentions
 2005 Best Non-Sex Performance, Buckleroos Parts I and II

Gay Erotic Video Awards 
 1994 Best Actor,
 1993 Best Cumshot a tie with Grant Larson

The "Dave" Awards 
 1994 Best Sex Scene, the orgy in The Wild Ones, featured performer along with Wolff

Probe/Men in Video Awards 
 1997 Porn Legend

AVN Awards 
(The AVN Awards included a gay award category up until 1998; they were separated into the GayVN Awards in 1999.)
 1994 Best Supporting Actor—Gay Video
 1994 Best Newcomer—Gay Video

Partial videography 

 Unsuitable (2010, Pantheon Productions)
 The Abduction Series, Part II: The Conflict (1993, Falcon Studios)
 The Abduction Series, Part III: Redemption (1993, Falcon Studios)
 Ace in the Hole Backstage Pass (Hothouse)
 The Best Of Brad Stone (2007, Falcon Studios)
 The Best of Zak Spears (Falcon Studios)
 Blue Movie (2009, Falcon Studios)
 Bolt Boot Black Buckleroos (Colt Studio)
 The Coach's Boys (Falcon Studios)
 Double Vision (Falcon Studios)
 The Fluffer Hard Body Video Magazine (1993, Odyssey Men Video)
 Hard Cops (Massive)
 Hard Cops 2 (Massive)
 Hologram
 Home Grown (Falcon Studios)
 House Rules (Falcon Studios)
 The Joint The Journey Back The Look of a Man (Falcon Studios)
 Massive Muscle Bears (Massive)
 Night Watch (Falcon Studios)
 On The Mark (Hot House)
 Posing Strap
 Raw 2: No Limits
 Rivers of Cum
 Secret Sex 2: The Sex Radicals (1994, Catalina Video)
 Sex Crimes Solicitor Summer Fever (Falcon Studios)
 Total Corruption Unleashed: The Best of Zak Spears (Massive)
 Wet Palms Wide Strokes (Colt Studio)
 The Wild Ones (Tom of Finland)
 Zak Attack'' (Falcon Studios)

See also 
 List of male performers in gay porn films

References

External links 
 Zak Spears interview at unzipped.net
 
 

 

1965 births
Living people
American people of Russian descent
Gay pornographic film actors
Male actors from Chicago